No. 673 (Apache Training) Squadron, Army Air Corps was a glider squadron of the Royal Air Force, active during the Second World War.

History
No. 673 Squadron was formed at Bikram, Patna in (then) British India on 1 January 1945 as a glider squadron, with the intention of being used for airborne operations by South East Asia Command. It continued to train, as part of No. 344 Wing RAF, until the surrender of Japan, when it became surplus to requirements; the squadron was disbanded on 25 October 1945 at Kargi Road.

Present
The original squadron is represented today by 673 (AH) Training Squadron of 7 (Training) Regiment, Army Air Corps.

Aircraft operated

Squadron bases

References

Notes

Bibliography

External links
 

Royal Air Force aircraft squadrons
Military gliders
Helicopter units and formations
Westland Helicopters